The 2021–22 season was ŠK Slovan Bratislava's 16th consecutive in the top flight of Slovak football.

Slovan successfully retained their league title, winning a record-breaking fourth title in a row and 12th overall since the competition was established in 1993. However, they were not successful in defending their Slovak Cup title, after losing in the final.

As league champion from the previous season, Slovan qualified for the UEFA Champions League. They were eliminated in the second qualifying round. Subsequently, Slovan competed in this season's edition of the UEFA Europa League, but were eliminated in the play-off round. Afterwards, Slovan were transferred to the group stage of the newly created UEFA Europa Conference League, where the club finished third and did not advance to the next stage of the competition.

The season covers the period from 1 June 2021 to 31 May 2022.

Players

As of 21 May 2022

Transfers and loans

Transfers in

Loans in

Transfers out

Loans out

Friendlies

Pre-season

As part of the pre-season preparation, the club announced it would complete two training camps. One fitness training camp in Šamorín and then a training camp in Bad Tatzmannsdorf, Austria, where Slovan did participate in three pre-season fixtures. The final pre-season match was played in Bratislava.

Mid-season

As part of the first block of the mid-season preparation, focused mainly on fitness, Slovan were to play one friendly match, but it was cancelled due to COVID‑19 related issues. Subsequently, Slovan moved to Dubai, where they played three friendly matches. After returning home, the team played one more match.

Competition overview

Fortuna liga

League table

Regular stage

Championship group

Results summary

Results by matchday

Matches

Slovak Cup

UEFA Champions League

First qualifying round

The draw for the first qualifying round was held on 15 June 2021.

Second qualifying round

The draw for the second qualifying round was held on 16 June 2021.

UEFA Europa League

Third qualifying round

The draw for the third qualifying round was held on 19 July 2021.

Play-off round

The draw for the third qualifying round was held on 2 August 2021.

UEFA Europa Conference League

Group stage

The draw for the group stage was held on 27 August 2021 with the fixtures announced on a day later.

Results by matchday

Matches

Statistics

Goalscorers

Clean sheets

Disciplinary record

Awards

Fortuna liga Player of the Month

Fortuna liga Team of the Season

Fortuna liga Player of the Season

Fortuna liga Manager of the Season

Fortuna liga Under-21 Team of the Season

Notes

References

ŠK Slovan Bratislava seasons
ŠK Slovan Bratislava season
Slovan Bratislava
Slovan Bratislava
2021–22 UEFA Europa Conference League participants seasons